Phenethyl acetate is the ester resulting from the condensation of acetic acid and phenethyl alcohol. Like many esters, it is found in a range of fruits and biological products. It is a colorless liquid with a rose and honey scent and a raspberry-like taste.

References

Acetate esters